Dmitry Medvedev (born 1965) is the former prime minister and former president of Russia.

Dmitry Medvedev is also the name of:

 Dmitry Alexandrovich Medvedev (1918–1992), Soviet Air Force lieutenant general and hero of the Soviet Union
 Dmitry Gennadyevich Medvedev (1970–2005), Russian FSB officer and Hero of the Russian Federation
 Dmitry Medvedev (1981–2002), Russian serial killer; see Yuri Ustimenko and Dmitry Medvedev
 Dmitry Medvedev (partisan) (1898–1954), Soviet partisan movement leader

See also
 Dmitri Mendeleev